George is an extinct town in Franklin County, in the U.S. state of Missouri.

A post office called George was established in 1894, and remained in operation until 1905. Stephen H. George, an early postmaster, gave the community his last name.

References

Ghost towns in Missouri
Former populated places in Franklin County, Missouri